The 2017–18 Coupe de France preliminary rounds made up the qualifying competition to decide which teams took part in the main competition from round 7. This was the 101st season of the most major football cup in France. The competition was organised by the French Football Federation (FFF) and was open to all clubs in French football, as well as clubs from the overseas departments and territories (Guadeloupe, French Guiana, Martinique, Mayotte, New Caledonia (qualification via 2017 New Caledonia Cup), Tahiti (qualification via 2017 Tahiti Cup), Réunion, and Saint Martin).

The Preliminary rounds took place between February and October 2017.

Sixth round

Overseas departments and territories

Mayotte 

This match was played on 14 October 2017.

Note: Mayotte League structure (no promotion to French League structure):Division d'Honneur (DH)Division d'Honneur Territoriale (DHT)Promotion d'Honneur (PH)

Réunion
These matches were played on 21 and 22 October 2017. 

Note: Reúnion League structure (no promotion to French League structure):Régionale 1 (R1)Régionale 2 (R2)D2 Départemental (D2D)

French Guiana
These matches were played on 13 and 14 October 2017.

Note: French Guiana League structure (no promotion to French League structure):Regional 1 (R1)Regional 2 (R2)

Martinique
These matches were played on 20 and 21 October 2017.

Note: Martinique League structure (no promotion to French League structure):Régionale 1 (R1)Régionale 2 (R2)Régionale 3 (R3)

Guadeloupe
These matches were played between 18 and 25 October 2017.

Note: Guadeloupe League structure (no promotion to French League structure):Ligue Régionale 1 (R1)Ligue Régionale 2 (R2)Ligue Régionale 3 (R3)

Paris-Île-de-France 

These matches were played on 21 and 22 October 2017.

Bourgogne-Franche-Comté

These matches were played on 21 and 22 October 2017.

Centre-Val de Loire 

These matches were played on 21 and 22 October 2017.

Grand Est

The three sectors in Grand Est region were combined for the sixth round. These matches were played on 21 and 22 October 2017.

Nouvelle-Aquitaine 

These matches were played on 21 and 22 October 2017.

Auvergne-Rhône-Alpes 

These matches were played on 21 and 22 October 2017.

Méditerranée 

These matches were played on 21 and 22 October 2017.

Occitanie

Midi-Pyrénées 
These matches were played on 21 October 2017.

Languedoc-Roussillon 
These matches were played on 21 and 22 October 2017.

Corsica 

These matches were played on 21 and 22 October2017.

Pays de la Loire 

These matches were played on 21 and 22 October 2017.

Bretagne 

These matches were played on 21 and 22 October 2017.

Normandie 

These matches were played on 21 and 22 October 2017.

Hauts-de-France 

These matches were played on 21 and 22 October and 5 November 2017.

References

Preliminary rounds